Joel Blum is an American stage actor.

Early life
Blum was born in San Francisco, California. After attending the College of Marin, he joined the national touring company of Godspell at the American Conservatory Theater in San Francisco.

Career
Blum was nominated for the Tony Award for Best Featured Actor in a Musical twice. The first was in 1995 for his role as Frank in the Broadway revival of Show Boat. The second nomination was in 1997 for playing Buddy Becker in the original Broadway production of Steel Pier. He was also nominated for the 2004 Drama Desk Award for Outstanding Featured Actor in a Musical for his role in Golf: The Musical.

He appeared in the original production of 42nd Street on Broadway in 1980.  Other Broadway roles include Stardust (1987), The Music Man (2000) and Debbie Reynolds On Broadway (1976). He played George in the second U.S. national tour of Billy Elliot the Musical, and Detective Marks/Man in the Off-Broadway musical Kid Victory (2017).

Theatre credits

References

American male musical theatre actors
Male actors from San Francisco
Year of birth missing (living people)
Living people
20th-century American male actors
21st-century American male actors
College of Marin alumni